Moscow Moods is a 1936 American short film directed by Fred Waller. It was nominated for an Academy Award at the 9th Academy Awards in 1936 for Best Short Subject (One-Reel).

Cast
 Yasha Bunchuk as Himself

References

External links

1936 films
1936 short films
American black-and-white films
Paramount Pictures short films
1930s English-language films